Colonel Shorty Brown  was an artillery who commanded the South African Artillery, School of Artillery (two separate occasions) and 4 Field Regiment

Military career

He joined the Union Defence Force in 1950. He later served as the Battery Commander of 43 Battery at 2 SA Infantry Battalion Group, Officer Commanding 4 Field Regiment, Officer Commanding School of Artillery at two different instances and later Director Artillery (double hat appointments) before Brigadier J.J.  Stapelberg took over the latter role in early 1970. Col Brown also served as a staff officer at the SADF Headquarters, Army Headquarters, 8 Division and North Western Command at Potchefstroom before retirement in 1985.

Awards and decorations

References

South African military officers
1930 births
Possibly living people
White South African people
South African people of Dutch descent